Malukah (born in 1982) is the artist name of Judith de los Santos, a Mexican composer and singer-songwriter known for her cover versions of music from video games or TV series and movies, which she publishes on YouTube. She became known to an international audience when a video of her cover of the song The Dragonborn Comes from the game The Elder Scrolls V: Skyrim became a viral video in November 2011. Since then she has contributed to several video game soundtracks, composed and produced original music, and performed live.

Career

Early career and education 
Being a gamer since childhood, Judith de los Santos grew up with gaming related music. She started writing songs and singing at the age of 15, took guitar, piano and percussion lessons to later study at the Berklee College of Music. She graduated in 2005 with a dual major in Music Production and Engineering and Film Scoring with her debut album All of the Above.

YouTube and video game soundtracks 
In November 2011, shortly after the release of The Elder Scrolls V: Skyrim, her cover version of the game's song The Dragonborn Comes went viral. The video was reposted on the IGN YouTube channel as well as gaming-related websites and became quickly popular. The original video on her own channel has over 23 million views, while the version on IGN's channel has over 17 million views by February 2020. This and other popular videos, including songs set to music from the Mass Effect, Halo and The Witcher game series helped her to obtain work in the video game industry.

She was commissioned to provide vocals for songs for the game Call of Duty: Black Ops II in 2012, The Banner Saga franchise (collaborating with Austin Wintory, Taylor Davis and Peter Hollens). In 2014, she composed and sang the ingame NPC bard songs and the end credits song Beauty of Dawn for the MMORPG Elder Scrolls Online. She was invited to be a part of an upcoming symphony project by video game composer Jeremy Soule, The Northerner. She provided vocals for music in the short film The Forge, collaborating with Austin Wintory and Tina Guo. She worked with Peter Hollens on a cover version of the Civilization IV Theme (originally composed by Christopher Tin) Baba Yetu. Together they also worked on a cover of Lullaby of Woe, a song from the Witcher 3 soundtrack. Her vocals were featured in the song Outside the Realm in the 2nd season Stranger Things soundtrack. The song was originally composed by Big Giant Circles for the video game There Came an Echo and was reused as thematic music for this purpose. She also worked with Miracle of Sound on his popular song Legends of the Frost based on the video game The Elder Scrolls V: Skyrim. She is featured on the Call of Duty: Black Ops 3 soundtrack. She provided vocal effects for the game Far Cry Primal working with BAFTA award-winning composer Jason Graves. Recently, she contributed to the soundtracks of the video games Call of Duty: Black Ops 4 and the PlayStation 4 Virtual reality game Moss. She and other musicians were invited by CD Projekt musical director Marcin Przybyłowicz to participate in a music video that recreates The Witcher 3: Wild Hunt main theme to celebrate the game's 5th anniversary in 2020. Lately, she contributed vocals to music to the game The Pathless and worked on vocal editing the Call of Duty: Black Ops Cold War song Alone.

Live performances, streaming and original music 
She performed the Halo tribute song Frozen Sleep at the Halo Global Championships 2013 at PAX Prime. Furthermore, she performed video game music at SXSW and The Game Awards. She was a guest performer at the Video Games Live E3 concert 2014 in Los Angeles and in her hometown Monterrey in 2016. She was invited to sing at The Elder Scrolls Online tavern community event during Gamescom 2018 in Cologne, Germany. She performed at the Argentina Game Show in Buenos Aires in 2019 and the CES 2020 in Las Vegas.

Malukah streamed as a partnered streamer on Twitch for almost 1,000 hours between 2016 and 2020, having reached 662,000 views and 38,800 followers in the music & performing arts and gaming category. Since 2020, she focused live streaming on YouTube.

In 2019, she released her latest original album I Follow the Moon.

Style and genre 
Her two original albums mostly cover the genres Pop rock or Folk rock. Collaborations with other musicians like Sonic Mayhem or Headhunterz are influenced by electronic music. Her contributions to the Call of Duty: Black Ops games cover the genre of Heavy Metal. The video game contributions, movie related originals, covers and medleys can be classified as fantasy folk rock or fantasy music. Her covers are influenced by music set to games like Mass Effect, The Elder Scrolls, The Witcher, Halo and Destiny, movies like The Hobbit and The Lord of the Rings or TV series like Game of Thrones. Recent releases mainly consist of cover works and single releases to various original songs (e.g. Hallelujah, Sound of Silence) or gaming-related soundtracks (e.g. Answers from Final Fantasy XIV or Nostalgia from the 2022 video game Asterigos by Composer WeiFan Chang).

Her vocal range can be considered as alto.

Discography

Original albums 

All of the Above (self-published album, 2006)
I Follow the Moon (2019)

Featured work 

Forget the Lines, Secret (both songs from: Acoustic Cafe Series, Vol.1, 2009)
Reignite (Headhunterz ft. Malukah, 2012)
Legends of the Frost (Miracle of Sound, ft. Malukah, 2012)
Bleed Forever (in: Doomsday, Sonic Mayhem ft. Malukah, 2015)
World of Warcraft: Malach, Angel Messenger (in: Video Games Level 5, 2016)
Al Fin (from: Song Planet, 2016)
One More Time (from: Days of Tomorrow, R. Armando Morabito, 2017)

Cover related albums/singles 

The Dragonborn Comes (2017)
Reignite, a tribute to Mass Effect, single, released by Materia Collective (2020)
Lullaby of Woe (from: The Witcher 3, ft. work with Peter Hollens, 2020)
Good Riddance (ft. work with Peter Hollens, 2021)
Come little children (single, cover, 2021)

Video game soundtrack contributions

TV soundtrack contributions 

Panic Nation (2010, lyricist, composer)
The Forge (short film, 2013, feat. vocals)
Outside the Realm (feat. vocals), Stranger Things (Season 2, episodes 02 and 07)

Collaborations 
Malukah's collaborations usually involve other YouTube musicians like singer Peter Hollens or violinist Taylor Davis. For her video game contributions, she repeatedly worked with the composers Austin Wintory and Jason Graves. Further collaborations involved musicians like Elena Siegman, Tina Guo and Kevin Sherwood. Most noted were her collaborations with ZeniMax Online Studios for the bard songs and end credits song of The Elder Scrolls Online and with Treyarch for the Call of Duty: Black Ops franchise, contributing to several of the Zombie easter egg songs.

Awards 

 Winner of the 10th Unisong International Song Contest 2005 (Everything)
 Two wins in the Rock category at the 16th LA Music Awards as female singer-songwriter of the year (Everything) and female vocalist of the year (I can't make it rain), and another nomination in Rock category for best album (All of the Above) in 2006.

Trivia 

 Malukah is known to sing in various real and fantasy languages. For parts of her cover versions from The Elder Scrolls franchise, she sang in dragon language. For her cover version of Priscilla's song from the game The Witcher 3: Wild Hunt, she sang one verse in Polish as a tribute to the country, where The Witcher franchise has originated. For The Banner Saga soundtrack she sang in Icelandic. For the Civilization IV theme Baba Yetu she sang in Swahili. For the cover The Fields of Ard Skellig, a song from The Witcher 3: Wild Hunt original soundtrack, she sang in Gaelic.
Her bard songs can be listened to in-game performed by several bard NPCs in The Elder Scrolls Online.
A NPC with the name of Malukah Lightsong was introduced with the Patch 6.2.0 in the video game World of Warcraft.
She wrote a self-published short novel called The Stolen Pendant.
The Skyrim modding community has added her Dragonborn cover to various game mods.

References

External links

Malukah's YouTube channel
Malukah's Patreon page
Interview with Malukah

Living people
Mexican women singer-songwriters
Mexican singer-songwriters
Mexican women composers
Video game composers
Berklee College of Music alumni
Video games based on musicians
Twitch (service) streamers
Cover artists
Mexican YouTubers
1982 births